Kouassi-Datékro is a town in eastern Ivory Coast. It is a sub-prefecture and commune of Koun-Fao Department in Gontougo Region, Zanzan District.

In 2014, the population of the sub-prefecture of Kouassi-Datékro was 25,833.

Villages
The xx villages of the sub-prefecture of Kouassi-Datékro and their population in 2014 are:

Notes

Sub-prefectures of Gontougo
[[Category:Communes of
 Gontougo]]